Ana Lucía Migliarini de León (born 16 December 1983) is a Uruguayan former professional tennis player.

Migliarini de León won three singles and eight doubles titles on the ITF Circuit. On 31 March 2003, she reached her best singles ranking of world No. 338. On 25 November 2002, she peaked at No. 338 in the doubles rankings.

Playing for Uruguay Fed Cup team, Migliarini de León has a win–loss record of 16–24.

ITF finals

Singles (3–5)

Doubles (8–11)

References

External links 
 
 
 

1983 births
Living people
Sportspeople from Montevideo
Uruguayan female tennis players
20th-century Uruguayan women
21st-century Uruguayan women